The Roland GR-300 is an analog guitar synthesizer manufactured by Roland Corporation.

The GR-300 was considered the first "playable" guitar synthesizer. (Its predecessor, the GR-500, was plagued with tracking problems that rendered it virtually unplayable.) The GR-300 had no MIDI and could only be played through a GR-300 series guitar controller.

The actual synthesizer module sat on the floor and had the rugged appearance of a large guitar-type foot pedal (complete with carrying handles). It featured 6-voice polyphony, one voice per string and 2 oscillators per voice. Each pair of VCOs were harmonically locked to each string but could be tuned separately to play different pitches. The GR-300 also featured a VCF with variable lengthsweep up and down, and an LFO. Each string had an enable-disable switch as well as a string sensitivity switch (basically audio compression). Built-in footswitches controlled the VCO mode (single/dual), the VCO harmonize pitch (detuning of the VCO's), and the VCF mode (on, bypass, or inverted). There was also a pedal control input for the VCF. The GR-300 could output either the guitar, the synth, or a mix of the two.

Notable users
 Pat Metheny
 Chuck Hammer
 Robert Fripp
 Andy Summers
 Adrian Belew
 Charly García
 Shawn Lane
 Kazumi Watanabe
 David Byrne
 Jimmy Page
 Pete Townshend
 Trevor Rabin
 Jeff Beck

References

External links
 Roland GR-300 Guitar Synthesizer and G-808 Guitar

GR-300
Guitar synthesizers